Gunungapi Wetar is an isolated volcanic island to the north of Wetar island in the Banda Sea, Indonesia. The island, a stratovolcano, only extends 239 m above sea level, but the total height of the summit from the sea bed is over 5000 m. Explosions in 1512 and 1699 are the only historical eruptions of the volcano.

See also 

 List of volcanoes in Indonesia

References 

Active volcanoes of Indonesia
Stratovolcanoes of Indonesia
Volcanoes of the Lesser Sunda Islands
Landforms of Maluku (province)
Banda Sea
Holocene stratovolcanoes